Lewis Henry Haney (March 30, 1882 – July 1, 1969) was a conservative American economist,  professor, and economic columnist.  He was born in Eureka, Illinois, and educated at Illinois Wesleyan University, Bloomington, Illinois. He received a B.A. and M.A. from Dartmouth College.
Ned

Haney lectured at New York University in 1908, afterwards teaching at the universities of Iowa and Michigan, and was a professor of economics at the University of Texas.  In 1920, he became director of the New York University Bureau of Business Research and professor of economics. In 1921 he was elected as a Fellow of the American Statistical Association. He was a syndicated columnist on economics for many years; a conservative, he attacked many aspects of the New Deal. He retired from teaching in 1955.

He was married twice, fathering one daughter, Hope Haney West. His first wife was Anna Meta Stephenson. His second wife was Louise Olivier Thion.

He was an Episcopalian and died of a stroke in Roslyn, New York.

Works

 A Congressional History of Railways, (volume i, 1908; volume ii, 1910)
 History of Economic Thought, (1911, revised edition, 1919)
 Business Organization and Combination, (1913); and various articles on economic subjects for periodicals.

References

1882 births
1969 deaths
Economists from Illinois
American economics writers
American male non-fiction writers
Illinois Wesleyan University alumni
University of Wisconsin–Madison alumni
New York University faculty
People from Eureka, Illinois
University of Iowa faculty
University of Michigan faculty
Fellows of the American Statistical Association
Mathematicians from Illinois
20th-century American economists
University of Texas faculty
20th-century American male writers